Pignus lautissimum is a species of jumping spider in the genus Pignus. It is native to Tanzania. The male was first described in 2000.

References

Endemic fauna of Tanzania
Salticidae
Invertebrates of Tanzania
Spiders of Africa
Spiders described in 2000